Sportfreunde Siegen is a German association football club based in Siegen, North Rhine-Westphalia. After going through insolvency in 2008, the first team was forcibly relegated to the fifth-tier NRW-Liga. Promotion to fourth division Regionalliga West was accomplished in 2012, but the club continued to struggle while going back and forth between fourth and fifth league play. In 2017, the club had to file for insolvency for a second time.

The club’s home ground is the Leimbachstadion, an arena that can host up to 18,500 people.

History

The early years 
The club was founded in 1899 as the football department of a gymnastics club called Turnverein Jahn von 1879 Siegen, being one of the first clubs in Western Germany to offer organized football to its members. In 1923, it merged with Sportverein 07 Siegen to become an independent football club called Sportfreunde Siegen von 1899.

The 1920s also marked the club's first ascension to the national level, competing in the Western German championship after claiming the crown in the district league four times in a row. Despite these results, the team did not qualify for the first division when German football was re-organized in the Third Reich. After World War II, the club initially could not match its pre-war successes until it won the German amateur championship in 1955 with a stunning 5–0 win over 05 Bad Homburg.

Two years later, Sportfreunde captain Herbert Schäfer was called up by national coach Sepp Herberger to play for the German national team. In 1954, Schäfer had been the last player being cut from the team which went on to win the World Cup. To this day, Herbert Schäfer still ranks as one of the best players to ever wear a Sportfreunde jersey.

Six years after winning the German amateur championship, Sportfreunde Siegen made the jump to professional football in 1961. When the Bundesliga was introduced in 1963, the club settled in the Regionalliga, which was the second highest division at the time. League games against renowned clubs such as Bayer Leverkusen, Fortuna Düsseldorf or Borussia Mönchengladbach were common during these days.

After some years of struggle, Sportfreunde Siegen fought its way back to professional football in 1972, claiming the West German amateur championship and promoting to the second-tier Regionalliga once again. Siegen remained on the professional stage for two more years before the introduction of the 2. Bundesliga forced the club to withdraw from this level in 1974. For the following twelve years, Sportfreunde Siegen continuously played in Germany's third division. After several ups and downs in the late 1980s and early '90s, the club made it back to third-tier Regionalliga in 1997, narrowly missing out on the promotion to the 2. Bundesliga by one game in 1999. In the same year, the team advanced to the quarter-finals of the DFB-Pokal, the German cup, before losing to Bundesliga side VfL Wolfsburg in a highly contested match.

Recent history 

The first decade of the new millennium turned out to be the most eventful in the club's rich history. After a last-minute victory on the last match day of the 2004–05 campaign, the club was finally promoted to 2. Bundesliga. Local hero and future German international Patrick Helmes led the team with 21 goals.

The following season saw the refurbishment of Leimbachstadion, the club's home ground since 1957, to its current capacity of 18,700 and quite decent results in the first half of the 2005–06 campaign in the 2. Bundesliga. German football heavyweight VfL Bochum was beaten 3–0, as was SC Freiburg. However, after a lacklustre performance in the second half of the season, the team was not able to avoid relegation. Two years later, Sportfreunde Siegen had to file for insolvency after failing to qualify for the newly established 3. Liga. The club managed to resume operations in fifth-division NRW-Liga. It returned to the Regionalliga West with the 2012–13 campaign and came in fifth in its first season back in semi-professional football, repeating this result in the following season. The team finished second-last in the Regionalliga in 2015 and was relegated from the league but bounced back immediately by winning the Oberliga Westfalen championship. Following another relegation they have been again playing in the Oberliga since 2017.

Management 
The club is chaired by Roland Schöler. Patrick Helmes serves as head coach.

Honours 
The club's honours:
 German amateur championship
 Winners: 1955
 Oberliga Westfalen
 Champions: 1997, 2016
 Westphalia Cup
 Runners-up: 2003, 2004, 2014

Former managers

 Gerd vom Bruch (1986–1987)
 Ingo Peter (1994–2003)
 Michael Feichtenbeiner (2003–2004)
 Gerhard Noll (2004)
 Ralf Loose (2004–2005)
 Jan Kocian (2005–2006)
 Uwe Helmes (2006)
 Hannes Bongartz (2006)
 Ladislav Biro (2006)
 Ralf Loose (2006–2007)
 Marc Fascher (2007–2008)
 Peter Németh (2008–2009)
 Rob Delahaye (Oct 2009-10)
 Andrzej Rudy (Jun 2010–2011)
 Michael Boris (2011–2014)
 Matthias Hagner (2014)
 Michael Boris (2014–2015)
 Ottmar Griffel (2015–2016)
 Thorsten Seibert (2016–2017)
 Dominik Dapprich (2017–2019)
 Tobias Cramer (2019–2022)
 Lirian Gerguri (2022)
 Patrick Helmes (since 2023)

Women's football 
In 1996 the women's department of TSV Siegen moved to the Sportfreunde. At that time the team had been the most successful team in the Bundesliga. Since the team was denied a license for the 2001–02 Bundesliga season they have not returned to the Bundesliga, moving between second and third league. In the 2008–09 season they have played in the Regionalliga (III), were relegated to the fourth tier Verbandsliga Westfalen in 2009–10 but managed direct promotion to the Regionalliga West for the 2010–11 season.

Honours 
All the honours were gained when the women's department was still a part of TSV Siegen.
 German women's champions: 1987, 1990, 1991, 1992, 1994, 1996
 Women's German Cup champions: 1986, 1987, 1988, 1989, 1993

References

External links 

  
 Abseits Guide to German Soccer

 
Football clubs in Germany
Football clubs in North Rhine-Westphalia
Association football clubs established in 1899
1899 establishments in Germany
Frauen-Bundesliga clubs
Siegen
2. Bundesliga clubs